Megalota purpurana is a species of moth of the family Tortricidae. It is found in Kenya.

References

Endemic moths of Kenya
Moths described in 2004
Olethreutini